VOEA Neiafu (P201) was a Pacific Forum patrol vessel operated by Tonga since 1989. It was decommissioned in 2020.

Background

Australia provided the patrol vessels free of charge, and helped build port facilities and provide training. This allowed its neighbours to exercise sovereignty over their EEZ, intercept smugglers, poaching fishers, and provide emergency services.

Australia will replace Neiafu and her two sister ships with two slightly larger and more capable vessels between 2019 and 2020.

Design

The  vessels displace 162 tonnes, and are built using commercial off-the-shelf (COTS) equipment, instead of more expensive, high-performance, military-grade equipment, to ease the maintenance burden, since local maintenance will be performed in small, isolated shipyards.

Operational history

In 2009, after 20 years of service, Neiafu returned to Australia for a major refit.

In 2015 Neiafu traveled to Vanuatu to provide aid following a typhoon.

In 2016 Neiafu participated in a joint exercise with vessels of other nations.

Neiafu completed another Australian refit in 2017.

References

Neiafu
Pacific Forum class patrol vessels
1989 ships